Smash is the fourth studio album by French DJ and record producer Martin Solveig. It was released on 6 June 2011 by Mixture Stereophonic and Mercury Records. The album's lead single, "Hello" (a collaboration with Canadian band Dragonette), was released on 6 September 2010 and became a worldwide hit, topping the charts in five countries. "Ready 2 Go" was released as the album's second single on 28 March 2011 and features English singer Kele Okereke.

Track listing

Notes
  signifies a remixer and additional producer

Personnel
Credits adapted from the liner notes of Smash.

 Martin Solveig – instruments, production, programming ; lead vocals, backing vocals 
 Birdyben – design
 Tom Coyne – mastering 
 Dev – lead vocals, backing vocals 
 Dragonette – lead vocals, backing vocals 
 JB Gaudray – guitar 
 Idoling!!! – lead vocals, backing vocals 
 Julien Jabre – instruments, production, programming 
 Kele – lead vocals, backing vocals 
 Sunday Girl – lead vocals, backing vocals 
 Michael Tordjman – instruments, production, programming 
 Philippe Weiss – mixing ; mastering

Charts

Release history

References

2011 albums
Martin Solveig albums
Mercury Records albums